The 1991 24 Hours of Le Mans was the 59th Grand Prix of Endurance, and took place on 22 and 23 June 1991.  It was also the fourth round of the 1991 FIA Sportscar World Championship season.

Pre-race
An entirely new complex along the front stretch was built, housing modern pit stalls, garages, and the new observation suites built above the garages.

As for the race, the grid line-up was an unusual affair. 1991 was supposed to be the first year the World Sportscar Championship ran to the new '3.5L' rules, which meant a new breed of sports-prototypes. Although TWR-Jaguar, Mercedes-Benz and Peugeot all built cars to the new regulations for the 1991 championship series, the number of privateer teams was low and there was simply not enough of these new cars to fill the grid.  The FIA allowed the first 10 spaces on the grid to be reserved for the fastest qualifying 3.5L cars from the World Sportscar Championship, while the rest of the field was made up of older formula Group C cars.  In another twist, some teams which had 3.5L cars, but entered previous year's championships with Group C cars, were allowed to enter their "obsolete" but more reliable (and for Le Mans in 1991, quicker) Group C racers. In the case of TWR Jaguar and Mercedes-Benz, their 3.5L cars (the XJR-14 and C291 respectively) failed to qualify and instead they raced using their XJR-12 and C11 models.  Peugeot Sport on the other hand only had their 905 model to race, with 1991 being their first full season in sportscar racing.  Being the only factory team running the 3.5L formula, the French marque had the honour of starting 1st and 2nd, even though they had only set the 3rd and 8th fastest qualifying times.

The Mercedes squad was in advanced negotiations with Emerson Fittipaldi, Mario Andretti and Michael Andretti in a deal to enter a CART 'superteam' in the race. A preliminary deal had been agreed before publication of the CART Indycar calendar which threw up a clash between the French classic and the Portland round of the US series.

Qualifying
Class leaders are in bold

Race
The two Peugeots immediately led away at the start, whilst the top Group C cars, led by Mercedes, made light work of the other 3.5L cars. Peugeot’s joy was short-lived though, the #5 briefly catching fire whilst refuelling at its first pitstop, although it quickly rejoined the race. More serious problems loomed however, their cars started suffering from engine problems and would both drop out before nightfall. With the French team out, the three Mercedes took control at the front, with Jean-Louis Schlesser in car #1 and Michael Schumacher in #31 debating the lead throughout the early hours. Their only drama came when Wendlinger spun under the Dunlop Bridge on cold tires having just taken over the #31, forcing him to pit for a new rear wing.

Jaguar had a difficult race. They qualified poorly due to carrying a 200 kg weight penalty for running their older Group C cars (which badly affected the handling), and they never looked like repeating the previous years success. The Porsches had to carry the same penalty and they too never featured in the victory battle. Thus as the race settled down, the job of chasing Mercedes fell to the #55 Mazda of youngsters Johnny Herbert, Bertrand Gachot and Volker Weidler. Mazda hadn’t been viewed as victory contenders before the race, their 787B having achieved virtually nothing in the way of results previously. However, the team had exploited a loophole in the rules, which stated that naturally aspirated, rotary-powered old Group C1 cars weren't required to run at 1000 kg, but at 850 kg, and eventually the Mazda managed to run at 830 kilogrammes. Combined with their rotary Wankel engine providing better fuel mileage than the other ballasted cars, it left them running a strong fourth as night fell.

Mercedes were looking comfortable out front, but as Sunday rolled around their race began to unravel.
The #31 had to pit several times to fix a gearbox problem, which cost 9 laps and dropped it down the field. The #32 then dropped out when it ran over debris; the impact damaged an engine mounting and the subsequent vibrations caused it to expire just before dawn. With the #1 spooked by the downfall of their teammates, the Mazda, now up to second, upped the pace in an attempt to try to break the final Mercedes. #31 was forced to pit again with high water temperature, and then at noon Alain Ferté brought a steaming #1 down pit lane having befallen the same fate. The alternator bracket had sheared, and in the process had snapped the water pump drive belt. Unlike their teammates however, their engine had overheated beyond repair and the dominant car of the race was pushed into the garage to retire.

From there the Mazda was never headed, and crossed the line with a two lap advantage over second place to secure a surprising and popular victory. It was the first Japanese car to ever win Le Mans, as well as the only non-piston engined car ever to do so. Jaguar’s reliability made up for their pace disadvantage, and the British marque secured second, third and fourth place, with the remaining #31 Mercedes recovering to complete the top five.

Official results

Class winners in bold.  Cars failing to complete 70% of the winner's distance marked as Not Classified (NC).

Statistics
 Pole Position - Jean-Louis Schlesser, #1 Team Sauber Mercedes - 3:31.270
 #3 Silk Cut Jaguar was originally on pole but was withdrawn prior to the race.
 Fastest Lap - Michael Schumacher, #31 Team Sauber Mercedes - 3:35.564
 Distance - 4922.810 km
 Average Speed - 205.333 km/h
 Highest Trap Speed — Sauber Mercedes C11 - 342 km/h (race), Sauber Mercedes C11 - 363 km/h (qualifying)

References

24 Hours of Le Mans races
Le Mans
24 Hours of Le Mans
Le Mans
June 1991 sports events in Europe